Holmger Knutsson (1210s – 1248) was a Swedish nobleman and a  claimant to the Swedish throne during the reign of King Eric XI of Sweden.

His tomb cover showed two Coats of Arms: one is known to have been used by his father, the other is that of the House of Bjelbo. It is could thus be considered likely that his mother came from that family, though it has also been claimed by Lagerqvist and others that she was Helena Pedersdatter Strange.

Holmger Knutsson was the eldest son of King Canute II of Sweden. At his father's death in 1234, Holmger seems to have been on his way to be the new king, but he was side-tracked by Jarl Ulf Fase and earlier King Eric XI who had been exiled in Denmark since 1229. Holmger's whereabouts after that are not known, but it has been speculated that he held Gästrikland north of Uppland for the next thirteen years.

Together with folkungs, Holmger made an unsuccessful attempt for the crown  in 1247. The Battle of Sparrsätra took place in Uppland north of Enköping between forces led by Birger Jarl and rebels led by Holmger Knutsson.  According to Erikskrönikan,  after defeat in the battle Holmger fled to Gästrikland but was captured, quickly brought to trial and beheaded in 1248.

There seems to have been a widespread attempt to have Holmger established as a saint, but that was eventually suppressed. The later manuscripts show that a special chapel was built to consecrate Holmger Knutsson in Björklinge, Norunda härad, in Uppland. He lies buried next to his father in Skokloster (Sko Abbey) Church in Håbo, near Uppsala. Holmger was married to Helena Philipsdotter. They had no known children.

Sources
Adolfsson,  Mats När borgarna brann - svenska uppror (Stockholm: Natur & Kultur, 2007)

Harrison, Dick Jarlens sekel - en berättelse om 1200-talets Sverige (Ordfront, Stockholm: 2002) 
 Lagerqvist, Lars O. Sverige och dess regenter under 1000 år  (Bonniers, Stockholm: 1982)  
Larsson, Mats G. Götarnas riken : Upptäcktsfärder till Sveriges enande (Bokförlaget Atlantis AB. 2002)

External links
Video with English subtitles: Holmger Knutsson's tomb cover in the Swedish Museum of National Antiquities. Dick Harrison, history professor.

1210s births
1248 deaths
Swedish politicians
Swedish princes
Executed Swedish people
Disinherited European royalty
People executed by Sweden by decapitation
Sons of kings